Chris Carr or Christopher Carr may refer to:

 Chris Carr (Medal of Honor) (1914–1970), American soldier and Medal of Honor recipient
 Chris Carr (motorcyclist) (born 1967), American motorcycle racer, land speed record holder
 Chris Carr (basketball) (born 1974), American basketball player
 Chris Carr (American football) (born 1983), American football player
 Christopher M. Carr, Attorney General of the US state of Georgia